Camille-Eugène Pouliot M.D. (better known as Camille Pouliot) (November 29, 1897 – April 22, 1967) was a Canadian physician and provincial politician.

Born in Fraserville (Rivière-du-Loup), Quebec, Pouliot was the Minister of Hunting and Fishing from 1944 to 1960 and member of the Legislative Assembly of Quebec for Gaspé-Sud from 1936 to 1962.

References

1897 births
1967 deaths
People from Rivière-du-Loup
Union Nationale (Quebec) MNAs
French Quebecers